Yulabilla is a locality in the Western Downs Region, Queensland, Australia.

History 
The locality was named and bounded on 25 February 2000. The locality name derives from the parish name, which in turn is believed to be the name of an early settlement or pastoral station which first appears on the 1883 Darling Downs Run Map.

References 

Western Downs Region
Localities in Queensland